Mumias Constituency was an electoral constituency in Kenya. It was one of four constituencies in the former Butere/Mumias District. The constituency was established for the 1966 elections. It was later divided into Mumias West Constituency and Mumias East Constituency, part of Kakamega County.

Members of Parliament

Wards

References

Butere/Mumias District
Constituencies of Western Province (Kenya)
1966 establishments in Kenya
Constituencies established in 1966